Ziveh-ye Qureh (also Romanized as Zīveh-ye Qūreh) is a village in Mangur-e Gharbi Rural District, in the Central District of Piranshahr County, West Azerbaijan Province, Iran. At the 2006 census, its population was 225, in 29 families.

References 

Populated places in Piranshahr County